Sharad Malhotra (born 9 January 1983) is an Indian actor, who primarily works in Hindi television and Hindi films. He made his acting debut in 2004 with the role of Prince Goldy in Princess Dollie Aur Uska Magic Bag. His first major role was the lead role of Sagarpratap Singh in Banoo Main Teri Dulhann.

Sharad had his breakthrough with the role of Maharana Pratap Singh in Bharat Ka Veer Putra – Maharana Pratap and is noted for his portrayal of Rishi Singh Bedi in Kasam Tere Pyaar Ki and Veeranshu Singhania in Naagin 5.

He made his film debut in 2012 with From Sydney with Love.

Early life
Sharad was born on 9 January 1983 and was brought up in Kolkata, he did his B.Com from St. Xavier's College. In 2003, he won Face Of The Year in Kolkata from where his journey started.

Besides modeling and acting, Sharad is also enthusiastic about kickboxing, horse riding, and swimming.

Personal life
He dated actress Divyanka Tripathi for seven years before they broke up in 2015.

He then dated actress Pooja Bisht, for almost two years but they broke up in 2018.

He married Ripci Bhatia on 20 April 2019.

Career
2004–2013: Debut and early career
Malhotra attending acting workshop and did modelling after he came to Mumbai. He was the first male model to do a jewellery campaign. Malhotra started his career with India's Best Cinestars Ki Khoj as a Contestant in 2004. He then made his acting debut in the same year as Prince Goldy in Princess Dollie Aur Uska Magic Bag and had a cameo in Kabhie To Nazar Milao.

He had his first major role in 2006 with Banoo Main Teri Dulhan where he played the lead role of Sagar opposite Divyanka Tripathi and was later seen as Amar Upadhyay also. The show was successful. The show ended in mid-2009. In 2008, he was also a part of a dance reality show named Yeh hai Jalwa, which had various popular television celebrities, including Ronit Roy, Shweta Tiwari and Rakhi Sawant.

Post Banu main Teri Dulhan, he took a break from his TV career and went on to attend New York Film Academy in the year 2009. In 2010, he appeared as a contestant on Nachle Ve with Saroj Khan. In 2012, He made his film debut with the role of Rohit Khurana in From Sydney with Love.

2014–2020: Breakthrough and success

Sharad returned to acting in 2014 and had his breakthrough with the role of Maharana Pratap in Sony TV's Bharat Ka Veer Putra – Maharana Pratap opposite Rachana Parulkar. The show ended in 2015, it was successful and received praises, also winning awards. He later participated in Box Cricket League and was the Captain of Kolkata Baabu Moshayes in season 2.

In 2016, Malhotra played the lead role of Rishi in the show Kasam Tere Pyaar Ki. He also played the role of Ranbir Kapoor on the same show. It was also broadcast in the UK due to its popularity.

Malhotra also appeared in two Hindi films in 2016, My Father Godfather playing Prakash and Ek Tera Saath playing Kuwar Aditya Pratap Singh. In 2017, he appeared in his first music video Paas Baitho Na.

He also appeared as a guest on Comedy Nights Bachao. He next portrayed Raunak Singh in Star Bharat's Muskaan from 2018-2020.

2021–present: Acclaim and further career

In August 2020, he joined the cast of Naagin 5, portraying the prince of shape-shifting  named Veeranshu Singhania. It was his first negative role. Malhotra played the role as the Grey Shaded hero.

In March 2021, his music video Bepanah Pyar with Vyrl Originals was released, followed by Beypanah Ishq in August 2021. In the same year he appeared with Helly Shah in a peppy song Halo Re Halo and with Adaa Khan in a romantic song Door Ho Gaya.

In October 2021, he started portraying the role of Bakshi Jagabandhu in StarPlus's historical drama Vidrohi. It was his second historic character. The show went off-air after 5 month in March 2022 due to low ratings. In February 2022, he appeared in a short film Not Out'' along with Karan Wahi, where they both played the role of two best friends.

In the media
In 2021, he won the Iwmbuzz Award for Trendsetter of the Year.

He was also ranked number 7 in 
The Times Most Desirable Men on TV 2020.

In 2023,he was awarded the Best Foreign Actor at the Blue star Awards,Vietnam for Naagin 5.

Filmography

Television

Films

Short film

Music videos

Awards and nominations

References

External links 

Indian male television actors
Male actors in Hindi television
21st-century Indian male actors
Living people
1983 births